Fool's Assassin is the first book in the epic fantasy trilogy Fitz and the Fool, written by American author Robin Hobb. Ten years after the events of Fool's Fate, it resumes the story of FitzChivalry Farseer, a former assassin, as a middle-aged husband and father whose quiet life is disrupted by a new crisis.

Plot summary

FitzChivalry ("Fitz") is a bastard of the royal Farseer family of the Six Duchies, who had previously used his inherited magical Skill in the service of his king. After his past heroic sacrifices, Fitz had allowed all but his closest family and friends to believe that he had been killed. Under the name Tom Badgerlock, Fitz had enjoyed ten peaceful years with his wife and children as landholder of Withywoods, once the country estate of his father. 

Fitz's wife Molly informs him she is pregnant. While initially excited, Fitz begins to doubt that she is indeed pregnant. When time passes and no baby is born, both Fitz and Nettle fear Molly is losing her mind. When finally the baby is born, she is tiny and slow to develop. Molly names her Bee. In the beginning, Bee does not speak and everyone is certain she is not mentally sound. Fitz's former mentor Chade sends an apprentice assassin to leave something in Bee's cradle, but Fitz catches him. The boy's name is Lant (FitzVigilant). Kettricken arrives to acknowledge Bee as a Farseer, but is surprised by how small she is and fears she will not survive, therefore not recognizing her. 

The book continues interplaying the narration between Fitz and Bee, with some chapters told by Fitz and some by Bee.
Bee spies on the other children of Withywoods and they torment her. Slapping her, one of them releases her tongue (seeming to explain that Bee was born tongue-tied and therefore unable to speak clearly until the incident. She also teaches herself to read and write, amazing her parents.
Molly dies suddenly, seemingly of some illness. Fitz goes to pieces and Nettle wishes to take Bee with her to Buckkeep. 

Fitz is reminded of the haunting disappearance of the Fool, a beloved friend who had helped shape Fitz's destiny since childhood, by the appearance of menacing, pale-skinned strangers close to his home. Their arrival precipitates a new crisis and new tragedies, including an imminent and powerful threat to the life of Fitz's young daughter, Bee Farseer.

Fearing for the survival of both the Fool and his daughter, Fitz is driven to return to the world of court intrigue at Buckkeep Castle, where he must take up the threads of his old life in an effort to save everything he loves from destruction.

Fitz and Bee go to Oaksbywater to buy things for Winterfest. It is supposed to be a father-daughter day and Bee looks forward to it. Riddle goes with them and - to Bee's dismay - Lant and Shun join them to buy baubles for Shun and some supplies for Lant. They split up. Fitz, Bee and Riddle witness a man torturing his dog to get people to buy her pups (though it turns out they are not truly hers). Fitz, overcome by the dog's feelings, kills her out of mercy and nearly kills her owner. He buys the man's pups as well to save them. His rage scares Bee and Riddle, but also makes her proud of him. 
They stop at a tavern to eat and Lant and Shun join them. Bee does not enjoy them being there and leaves to use the privy. When she is outside, she encounters a beggar and decides to be brave like her father. She helps the blind beggar and when she touches him, he can see through her. Just as he hugs her, Fitz comes looking for Bee, overcome with fear that something has happened to her. He stabs the beggar, thinking he is trying to harm Bee. The beggar turns out to be the Fool, appearing haggard and wraith like from extreme torture. Fitz attempts to save him, but can't. He decides to take the Fool to Buckkeep to be skill-healed and sends Bee home with Lant and Shun, who are upset their day has been ruined and that Fitz does not respect them. Riddle, Fitz and the Fool travel by skill-pillar to Buckkeep.
Lang and Shun are neglectful of Bee when they arrive at Withywoods. Revel and Perserverence help her and Careful prepares her for bed.
The next day, Bee and Perserverence are in class with the other children. Withywoods is attacked and Bee and Perseverance hide the children in the spy passages. The attackers are a group of pale people dressed in white. Their leader is a woman and with her is a "fog-man" who seems like a child. They are aided by a group of Chalcedean mercenaries who kill, rape and pillage Withywoods, burning the stables with Perseverence's father and grandfather inside. Perseverance managed to secure two horses and he and Bee attempt to escape. Perseverence is shot with an arrow and left for dead. Bee is taken by the pale people who declare she is the Unexpected Son.

Reception
Critical reception for Fool's Assassin have been mostly positive. The Telegraph and Tor.com both gave favorable reviews for the work, which The Telegraph called "high art".

References

External links
 Official website of Robin Hobb

2014 American novels
American fantasy novels
Novels by Robin Hobb
Del Rey books